Boris Becker defeated Michael Chang in the final, 6–2, 6–4, 2–6, 6–2 to win the men's singles tennis title at the 1996 Australian Open.

Andre Agassi was the defending champion, but lost in the semifinals to Chang.

Seeds
The seeded players are listed below. Boris Becker is the champion; others show the round in which they were eliminated.

  Pete Sampras (third round)
  Andre Agassi (semifinals)
  Thomas Muster (fourth round)
  Boris Becker (champion)
  Michael Chang (finalist)
  Yevgeny Kafelnikov (quarterfinals)
  Thomas Enqvist (quarterfinals)
  Jim Courier (quarterfinals)
  Wayne Ferreira (second round)
  Goran Ivanišević (third round)
  Richard Krajicek (third round)
  Arnaud Boetsch (second round)
  Marc Rosset (withdrew)
  Andriy Medvedev (second round)
  Todd Martin (third round)
  Paul Haarhuis (first round)

Qualifying

Draw

Finals

Section 1

Section 2

Section 3

Section 4

Section 5

Section 6

Section 7

Section 8

External links
 Association of Tennis Professionals (ATP) – 1996 Australian Open Men's Singles draw
 1996 Australian Open – Men's draws and results at the International Tennis Federation

Mens singles
Australian Open (tennis) by year – Men's singles